USS LST-732 was a  in the United States Navy during World War II. She was transferred to the Republic of China Navy as ROCS Chung Shun (LST-208).

Construction and commissioning 
LST-732 was laid down on 5 January 1944 at Dravo Corporation, Pittsburgh, Pennsylvania. Launched on 19 February 1944 and commissioned on 2 February 1944.

Service in United States Navy 
During World War II, LST-537 was assigned to the Asiatic-Pacific theater. She was assigned to occupation and China from 28 September to 1 November 1945 and 20 November 1945 to 7 June 1946.

She was decommissioned on 29 May 1946 and struck from the Naval Register, 12 March 1948. She was sold for commercial service named Wan Guo.

Service in Republic of China Navy 
During the great retreat in 1949, she at that time was still only a civilian vessel, and had not joined the Chinese navy, but she also participated in emergency retreat operations. For example, in January of that year, the Central Radio Nanjing Main Station in the capital Nanjing was active in the chaotic situation. Operated, leased the ship, and berthed into Nanjing Xiaguan Wharf on the 22nd of the month, and then rushed to work day and night to transport more than a thousand boxes of broadcasting equipment and equipment on board. However, news of the upcoming blockade of the Yangtze River by the Lao Communist Party came one after another. , So the voyage was rushed, leaving behind a large number of equipment that was still too late to be shipped. After arriving in Shanghai in February, the important equipment of the Shanghai branch of China Central Broadcasting was installed and shipped to Taiwan.

On 14 August 1954, the Navy's then-training ship (the first-generation ROCS Chun Shun) ran aground in the waters of the Nanji Islands in Zhejiang Province and her hull was seriously damaged. It was finally decided to abandon the ship and was scrapped on 31 December of the same year. In 1955, the navy took over the Wan Guo from merchant service, using the previously scrapped Chung Shun's name and ship number LST-208. Thus she is the second ship to be named ROCS Chung Shun that has been in service so far.

She was acquired and commissioned into the Republic of China Navy on 7 January 1955 and renamed Chung Shun (LST-208).

Chung Shun was decommissioned on 1 April 2021.

Awards 
LST-732 have earned the following awards:

 China Service Medal (extended) 
American Campaign Medal 
Asiatic-Pacific Campaign Medal
World War II Victory Medal
Navy Occupation Service Medal (with Asia clasp)

Gallery

Citations

Sources 
 
 
 
 

LST-542-class tank landing ships
Ships built in Pittsburgh
World War II amphibious warfare vessels of the United States
LST-542-class tank landing ships of the Republic of China Navy
1944 ships